Eric Boothroyd (26 April 1927 – 16 August 2022) was an international speedway rider from England.

Speedway career 
Boothroyd was introduced to motor bikes by Geoff Duke when he served six years with the 15th Parachute Brigade in Egypt as a despatch rider. He first sat on a speedway bike in 1949 and began his career for Tamworth Tammies during the 1950 Speedway National League Division Three season. He rode in the top tier of British Speedway from 1950-1968, riding for various clubs.

Boothroyd reached the final of the Speedway World Championship in the 1956 Individual Speedway World Championship.

He ran two greengrocer shops and died in 2022.

World Final Appearances
 1956 -  London, Wembley Stadium - 10th - 7pts

References 

1927 births
2022 deaths
British speedway riders
Cradley Heathens riders
Birmingham Brummies riders
Bradford Dukes riders
Halifax Dukes riders
Leicester Hunters riders
Long Eaton Archers riders
Middlesbrough Bears riders
Oxford Cheetahs riders